Nostrand Avenue may refer to:

 Nostrand Avenue, a major street in Brooklyn, New York City

New York City Subway

Current stations
Nostrand Avenue (IND Fulton Street Line), serving the 
Nostrand Avenue (IRT Eastern Parkway Line), serving the  
IRT Nostrand Avenue Line, serving the

Former stations
Nostrand Avenue (BMT Myrtle Avenue Line)
Nostrand Avenue (BMT Fulton Street Line)
Nostrand Avenue (BMT Lexington Avenue Line)

Long Island Rail Road
Nostrand Avenue (LIRR station)

Other
Nostrand Avenue Line (surface)